ASAN Radio is a public radio station located in Baku, Azerbaijan, which broadcasts at 100 MHz. It was started with a test broadcast on 24 December 2015.The station also streams content over the Internet for free. The station currently broadcasts information about the realized  projects, services and innovations served by ASAN service. The national music is dominated on air.

"ASAN Radio" is the first and only radio specialized on public services established under the State Agency for Public Service and Social Innovations under the President of the Republic of Azerbaijan.

See also 
Azad Azerbaijan TV
Ictimai TV

References 

Radio stations in Azerbaijan
Radio stations established in 2015